Andrew James Edds (born September 18, 1987) is a former American football linebacker. He was drafted by the Miami Dolphins in the fourth round of the 2010 NFL Draft. He played college football at Iowa.

He has been a member of the Indianapolis Colts, New England Patriots and New York Jets.

Professional career

Miami Dolphins
He was expected to contribute immediately as a nickel linebacker due to his strong pass coverage skills at Iowa, but he tore his right anterior cruciate ligament (ACL) during the 2010 training camp and was lost for his rookie season. He was waived on September 5, 2011.

New England Patriots
Edds was claimed off waivers by the New England Patriots on September 6. He was waived on September 22, but re-signed to the Patriots practice squad on September 24.

Indianapolis Colts
On September 28, 2011, he was signed off the Patriots' practice squad by the Indianapolis Colts, reuniting him with friend and former teammate at Iowa Pat Angerer. On July 31, 2012, Edds tore his ACL. He was waived/injured, and was subsequently placed on injured reserve on August 2.

New England Patriots
On June 6, 2013, Edds was signed by the New England Patriots. On August 19, 2013, he was released by the Patriots.

New York Jets
Edds was signed by the Jets on May 19, 2014 after trying out for the team during rookie minicamp. He was released on August 30, 2014. He was re-signed by the team on September 1, 2014. Edds was released on October 28, 2014.

Jacksonville Jaguars
On December 3, 2014, Edds was signed by the Jacksonville Jaguars after they placed starting right tackle, Austin Pasztor, on injured reserve. Edds became a free agent after the 2014 season.

References

External links
Iowa Hawkeyes bio
LeVar Woods Football Academy bio

1987 births
Living people
Players of American football from Indiana
American football linebackers
Iowa Hawkeyes football players
Miami Dolphins players
New England Patriots players
Indianapolis Colts players
New York Jets players
Jacksonville Jaguars players
People from Greenwood, Indiana